This list contains only those stations operated by the DB Station&Service for passenger services. Passenger stations operated by private railways, other privately run stations like container, harbour or logistic stations and DB marshalling yards are not included. The current ranking of stations run by the DB for passenger services in Saxony is as follows:

All other stations operated by the Deutsche Bahn for passenger services belong to the lowest class 6; other stations are not categorised.

Sources

See also
List of railway stations in Chemnitz
German railway station categories
Railway station types in Germany

External links 

 Online timetable of DB services

 
Saxo
Rail